"Sugar" is a song by British post-punk revival band Editors from their fourth studio album The Weight of Your Love. The song was released as the fourth single from the album on 24 March 2014.

Track listing

Charts

References

External links

2013 songs
2014 singles
Editors (band) songs
PIAS Recordings singles
Song recordings produced by Jacquire King
Songs written by Edward Lay
Songs written by Russell Leetch
Songs written by Tom Smith (musician)
Songs written by Justin Lockey
Songs written by Elliott Williams